Goose (Otter Creek) Water Aerodrome  is located in Terrington Basin at Lake Melville, near Happy Valley-Goose Bay, Newfoundland and Labrador, Canada. It is open from June to November.

Airlines

There are two airlines that use Otter Creek, but offer only chartered hunting or fishing trips, as well as resource companies to access their mines.

 Innu Mikun Airlines
 Air Labrador

The airport is only in use during the summer to late fall.

Facilities

There are four piers for aircraft to park along the shore.

Fuel and airport storage (tie-down) are available at the aerodrome.

There is no terminal facility, and all other services (food, transportation, medical aid, car rental) are located nearby the airport.

There is no control tower, and contact is made with area control centre in Gander Airport.

Transportation

The aerodrome is accessed by road via North West River Road (Route 520).

See also

References

External links
 Otter Creek Aerodrome

Registered aerodromes in Newfoundland and Labrador
Seaplane bases in Newfoundland and Labrador